Thomas Johnstone Lawrence (14 May 1940 – 10 January 2018) was a Scottish professional footballer who played as a goalkeeper for Liverpool and Tranmere Rovers from the 1950s to the 1970s. Lawrence was with Liverpool for 14 years, making more than 300 league appearances, and he played in three full internationals for Scotland during the 1960s.

Early years
Lawrence was born Thomas Johnstone in Dailly, Ayrshire, one of three children of Frank and Ruby Lawrence. The Lawrence family moved to North West England when Tommy was a child along with elder brother William (Billy) and younger sister Mary. 
On leaving school he worked at Rylands wire factory and played for Croft Village Football Team, and then Warrington Town as an amateur.

Club career

Liverpool, 1957–1971
Aged 17, Lawrence was signed by Liverpool under the management of Phil Taylor in 1957. He made his first team debut under manager Bill Shankly, playing in a 1–0 defeat against West Bromwich Albion at the Hawthorns on 27 October 1962. His first clean-sheet came on 17 November, when Liverpool beat fellow promotion hopefuls Leyton Orient at Anfield 5–0, with Roger Hunt scoring a hat-trick.

Lawrence went on to retain the No.1 jersey that season making 35 appearances, including 6 ties in Liverpool's run to the FA Cup semi-final at Hillsborough. Leicester City were their opponents and prevented the Reds from reaching the 1963 FA Cup Final by winning the game 1–0. Liverpool had finished in 8th place in their first season back in the First Division, as their Merseyside rivals Everton won the 1962–63 league championship. The following season Lawrence played in 40 league games out of a possible 42, and he also played in 5 cup ties. Liverpool won the 1963–64 league championship, four points clear of Manchester United.

In the 1964–65 season Lawrence and Liverpool were unable to repeat the previous season's achievements, finishing in 7th place and a full 17 points behind winners Manchester United. However, a cup run took Liverpool to the 1965 FA Cup Final, where they faced Leeds United at Wembley. It was Liverpool's first cup final appearance since 1950, and they had never won the trophy before. Both sides had only conceded two goals during their runs to the final. Lawrence kept a clean sheet during the 90 minutes of normal time, but Liverpool also could not score so the game went into extra-time. After 3 minutes of the extra period Roger Hunt opened the scoring for Liverpool, but the lead lasted just 2 minutes as Billy Bremner scored the equaliser. In the 113th minute Ian St John headed the ball home for the winner to seal Liverpool's first F.A. Cup victory.

Lawrence enjoyed more success the following season as the Reds found their league form once more, winning the 1965–66 title by 6 clear points over Leeds. Such was Lawrence's form, consistency and durability he missed only a handful of games during eight years as the regular Liverpool goalkeeper. He is credited with being one of the first sweeper-keepers.

Lawrence held off the challenge of teenage keeper Ray Clemence when the youngster arrived from Scunthorpe United in 1967, but Liverpool had begun to decline as the team aged. Though Lawrence was not the eldest, he was suddenly removed from the team in favour of Clemence after a 1–0 6th round FA Cup defeat at Watford in 1970; along with outfield players Ron Yeats and Ian St John. Lawrence played for Liverpool only once more, against Manchester City in a 2–2 draw at Maine Road on 26 April 1971.

Tranmere Rovers, 1971–1974
After 390 appearances in the Liverpool goal, Lawrence joined Tranmere Rovers on 10 November 1971. He spent three years and made 80 league appearances for Tranmere under player/manager and ex-Liverpool teammate, Ron Yeats. Lawrence then drifted back into the non-league game with Chorley, before retiring.

International career
During his time at Liverpool, Lawrence won three caps for Scotland. His international debut came on 3 June 1963 in a friendly international at Dalymount Park, Dublin, which the Republic of Ireland won 1–0. Lawrence had to wait six years for his second and third caps, a 1–1 draw with West Germany in a 1970 World Cup qualifier and a 5–3 victory over Wales in a British Home Championship match. During the latter appearance, his last international, Lawrence collided with the crossbar and had to be carried off.

Later years and death
After Lawrence retired from professional football he returned to work at Rylands, the wire manufacturer.

In February 2015, Lawrence was inadvertently interviewed in the street by BBC journalist Stuart Flinders, who was asking elderly people if they remembered the 1966–67 FA Cup Fifth Round game between Liverpool and Everton. Lawrence, smiling, replied, "Yeah, I do. I played in it. I was the goalkeeper for Liverpool."

Lawrence died on 10 January 2018 in Warrington, at the age of 77.

Honours

Liverpool
Football League First Division (2): 1963–64, 1965–66
FA Cup (1): 1965
FA Charity Shield (3): 1964, 1965 (shared), 1966

References

External links
Thisisanfield.com Forgotten Heroes
Official past players at Liverpoolfc.tv
Player profile at LFChistory.net

1940 births
2018 deaths
Association football goalkeepers
Footballers from South Ayrshire
Liverpool F.C. players
Scottish footballers
Scotland international footballers
Tranmere Rovers F.C. players
Scotland under-23 international footballers
English Football League players
Anglo-Scots
Warrington Town F.C. players
FA Cup Final players